Rudi Brown (born 14 December 2003) is a Scottish rugby union player for Edinburgh in the United Rugby Championship. Brown's primary position is flanker. He was educated at Merchiston Castle School where he captained serval rugby teams.

Rugby Union career

Professional career

Brown was named in the Edinburgh academy for the 2021–22 season. He made his Edinburgh debut on 4 March in the Round 12 match of the 2021–22 United Rugby Championship against .

External links
itsrugby Profile

References

2003 births
Living people
Edinburgh Rugby players
Rugby union flankers
Scottish rugby union players
Rugby union players from Melrose, Scottish Borders

People educated at Merchiston Castle School